Martin Eden is a 1914 silent film drama directed by Hobart Bosworth and starring Lawrence Peyton. It is based on the 1909 novel by Jack London.

The film exists but is missing a couple reels.

Cast
Lawrence Peyton - Martin Eden
Viola Barry - Ruth Morse
Herbert Rawlinson - Arthur Morse
Rhea Haines - Lizzie Connolly
Ann Ivers - Maria Silva
Ray Myers - Russ Brissenden
Elmer Clifton - Cub reporter
Hobart Bosworth -
Myrtle Stedman -

See also
List of Paramount Pictures films

References

External links
 Martin Eden at IMDb.com

1914 films
American silent feature films
Incomplete film lists
Films based on American novels
Films based on works by Jack London
American black-and-white films
1910s American films